Stefansson Island is an uninhabited island in the Arctic Archipelago in the Kitikmeot Region of Nunavut, Canada. The island is located in Viscount Melville Sound, with M'Clintock Channel to the east. It lies just off Victoria Island's Storkerson Peninsula, separated by the Goldsmith Channel.
The first European sighting of the island was in 1917 by Storker T. Storkerson who was travelling with Canadian explorer Vilhjalmur Stefansson (1879-1962), for whom the island was named.

References

Further reading

 Fyles, J. G. Surficial Geology of Victoria and Stefansson Islands, District of Franklin. Ottawa: Roger Duhamel, Queen's Printr, 1963.

Victoria Island (Canada)
Uninhabited islands of Kitikmeot Region